Edison Tesla Marshall (August 28, 1894 – October 29, 1967) was an American short story writer and novelist.

Life
Marshall was born on August 28, 1894 in Rensselaer, Indiana. He grew up in Medford, Oregon, and attended the University of Oregon from 1913 to 1916. He served in the U.S. Army with the rank of second lieutenant. His 1917 World War I draft registration card indicated he was a "professional writer" employed by The American Magazine and The Saturday Evening Post, and that he was missing his thumb on his left hand. He married Agnes Sharp Flythe; they had two children, Edison and Nancy. In 1926, they moved to Augusta, Georgia. Marshall mainly wrote historical fiction. He also wrote some
science fiction about lost civilizations.

For some of his work, he used the pseudonym Hall Hunter.

His novel Benjamin Blake was adapted into a film in 1942, Son of Fury, starring Tyrone Power. Yankee Pasha-The Adventures of Jason Starbuck was adapted into the film Yankee Pasha, starring Jeff Chandler and Mamie Van Doren in 1954, as was The Vikings, starring Kirk Douglas, in 1958.

He held the Gold Cross, Order of Merit from the University of Miami.

A life-long hunter, he stalked big game in Canada, Alaska, Africa, Indo-China, and India. A high school hunting accident cost him his thumb.  He described his hunting experiences in The Heart of the Hunter, copyrighted in 1956.

He died on October 29, 1967, in Augusta, Georgia.

Awards
 1921 O. Henry Award

Works

 (reprinted 1950 as Trail's End, Popular Library )
 (reprinted 1950 as Riders of the Smoky Land)

 (reprinted 1972 as The Lost Land)

He had also worked on Parole, Inc. (1948), a film noir, as a dialog director.

Stories

References

External links

 
 
 
 
 
 "Reviews: The Pagan King", SF Site, Georges T. Dodds

1894 births
1967 deaths
20th-century American male writers
20th-century American novelists
20th-century American short story writers
American historical novelists
American male novelists
American male short story writers
American science fiction writers
Novelists from Georgia (U.S. state)
O. Henry Award winners
People from Medford, Oregon
People from Rensselaer, Indiana
University of Oregon alumni
Writers from Augusta, Georgia